St. Regis is an unincorporated community and census-designated place (CDP) in Mineral County, Montana. The population was 319 at the time of the 2010 census.

The post office opened in 1896.

Geography
St. Regis is located at  (47.299477, −115.100277), at the confluence of the St. Regis River and the Clark Fork. It is on Montana Highway 135, a shortcut to Glacier National Park. Interstate 90 runs along the southern edge of the community, with access from Exit 33. I-90 leads southeast  to Missoula and west  to Coeur d'Alene, Idaho.

Climate
This climatic region is typified by large seasonal temperature differences, with warm to hot (and often humid) summers and cold (sometimes severely cold) winters. According to the Köppen Climate Classification system, St. Regis has a humid continental climate, abbreviated "Dfb" on climate maps.

Demographics

As of the census of 2010, there were 319 people, 135 households, and 73 families residing in the CDP. The population density was 381.4 people per square mile (146.5/km). There were 161 housing units at an average density of 194.9 per square mile (74.9/km). The racial makeup of the CDP was 95.87% White, 2.54% Native American, 0.32% Asian, and 1.27% from two or more races. Hispanic or Latino of any race were 2.54% of the population.

There were 135 households, out of which 25.2% had children under the age of 18 living with them, 41.5% were married couples living together, 9.6% had a female householder with no husband present, and 45.2% were non-families. 38.5% of all households were made up of individuals, and 11.1% had someone living alone who was 65 years of age or older. The average household size was 2.33 and the average family size was 3.09.

In the CDP, the population was spread out, with 27.3% under the age of 18, 7.9% from 18 to 24, 26.3% from 25 to 44, 25.1% from 45 to 64, and 13.3% who were 65 years of age or older. The median age was 39 years. For every 100 females, there were 107.2 males. For every 100 females age 18 and over, there were 106.3 males.

The median income for a household in the CDP was $23,750, and the median income for a family was $27,750. Males had a median income of $29,250 versus $14,844 for females. The per capita income for the CDP was $14,137. About 18.2% of families and 21.0% of the population were below the poverty line, including 27.3% of those under age 18 and 15.2% of those age 65 or over.

Education
St. Regis School District educates students from kindergarten through 12th grade. Saint Regis High School's team name is the Tigers.

A branch of the Mineral County Public Library is in St. Regis.

Media 
 K29ID-D, Channel 29, licensed from Weeksville
 K34PQ-D, Channel 34, licensed from Plains

Some of the strongest AM radio stations in St. Regis include:
 KERR, 750 AM, licensed from Polson
 KJJR, 880 AM, licensed from Whitefish

Some of the strongest FM radio stations in St. Regis include:
 87.7 FM/channel 6, ION (KSRM-LD), licensed to St. Regis 
 KPLG, 91.5 FM, licensed from Plains
 KSRM-LP, 99.1, licensed to St. Regis (only local radio station)
 KENR-FM, 107.5, licensed from Superior

References

External links
 Clark Fork Valley-Press and Mineral Independent newspapers
 Visit Montana: St. Regis
 St. Regis Community Schools

Census-designated places in Mineral County, Montana
Census-designated places in Montana